Heat vision may refer to:
Thermography, image production using infrared radiation
Infrared vision, a capability of detecting infrared radiation
Heat vision (fiction), the fictional ability to burn objects with one's gaze

See also
Heat Vision and Jack, a 1999 television pilot